Héctor Claudio Jara Medina is a former Chilean football (soccer) player and  manager

Coaching career

Sonsonate FC 
In March 2014, Jara signed as new coach of Sonsonate of El Salvador, replacing Wilson Sánchez. In June 2014, Jara was replaced by Cesar Acevedo.

Return to Sonsonate FC 
In August 2015, Jara signed again as coach of Sonsonate, replacing Ennion Mendoza and Mario Elias Guevara. In October 2015, Jara was replaced by Edwin Portillo, after a strong discussion with the president of Sonsonate FC, Pedro Contreras.

Vendaval 
In August 2017, he signed as new coach of Vendaval.

External links 
 Héctor Jara at Soccerway 
 Héctor Jara at CeroaCero 

1950 births
Living people
Chilean footballers
Deportes Concepción (Chile) footballers
C.D. Huachipato footballers
Chilean football managers
Chilean expatriate football managers
Ñublense managers
Santiago Morning managers
Lota Schwager managers
Arturo Fernández Vial managers
Chilean Primera División managers
Primera B de Chile managers
Chilean expatriate sportspeople in El Salvador
Expatriate football managers in El Salvador
Chilean expatriate sportspeople in Guatemala
Expatriate football managers in Guatemala
Place of birth missing (living people)
Association footballers not categorized by position